Stewart Clair Barber (born June 14, 1939) is a former American football offensive tackle in the American Football League (AFL) for the Buffalo Bills. He also was an executive in the National Football League (NFL) for the Buffalo Bills. He played college football at Pennsylvania State University.

Early years
Barber attended Bradford Area High School. He accepted a football scholarship from Penn State University, where he was a two-way tackle. As a senior, he received All-American honors as an offensive tackle.

Professional career
Barber was selected by the Buffalo Bills in the fourth round  (27th overall) of the 1961 AFL Draft and was also selected by the Dallas Cowboys in the third round  (30th overall) of the 1961 NFL Draft. On January 8, 1961, he signed with the Bills. As a rookie, he started 14 games at outside linebacker and had 3 interceptions, returning one for a touchdown.

In 1962, he was moved to left tackle, protecting quarterbacks Warren Rabb, Jack Kemp and Al Dorow. He helped the team win two straight AFL Championships. In 1962, he filled in 6 games at left guard in place of an injured Billy Shaw.

Barber announced his retirement after the 1969 season. In his career he only missed one game, made first-team All-AFL two straight seasons and played in five consecutive AFL All-Star games. In 1970, he was named to the second-team American Football League All-Time Team.

Personal life
After football, he worked in the Buffalo Bills front office as a college scout, assistant General Manager and Vice President. On March 14, 1983, he resigned from the team.

Barber was the offensive line coach for the New York Stars and Charlotte Hornets of the World Football League in 1974, under head coach, Babe Parilli.

See also
List of American Football League players

References

External links
 Stew Barber bio
 1964 American Football League Champions
 1965 American Football League Champions

1939 births
Living people
People from Bradford, Pennsylvania
Players of American football from Pennsylvania
American football offensive linemen
Penn State Nittany Lions football players
Buffalo Bills players
Buffalo Bills scouts
Buffalo Bills executives
National Football League general managers
American Football League All-Star players
American Football League All-Time Team
American Football League players